Chizhovo is a rural locality (a village) in Vorshinskoye Rural Settlement, Sobinsky District, Vladimir Oblast, Russia. The population was 9 as of 2010. There are 20 streets. Grigory Potemkin was born in the village in around 1739.

Geography 
Chizhovo is located 29 km northeast of Sobinka (the district's administrative centre) by road. Buzakovo is the nearest rural locality.

References 

Rural localities in Sobinsky District